Frank Jones was a college football player.

Auburn
Jones played for Mike Donahue's Auburn Tigers of Auburn University, selected an All-Southern tackle in 1905  and unanimously elected captain for 1906. He was the third ever Auburn Tiger selected All-Southern, behind only Humphrey Foy and James Elmer. Jones was also captain of the basketball team.

References

American football tackles
Auburn Tigers football players
Auburn Tigers men's basketball players
All-Southern college football players
People from Escambia County, Alabama
Players of American football from Alabama
American men's basketball players